Yvonne Sanson (29 August 1925 – 23 July 2003) was a Greek-Italian film actress. She appeared in 46 films between 1946 and 1972, mainly working in Italy. Born in Thessaloniki, Sanson was a naturalised Italian citizen and was maternally of Greek origin and paternally of French-Russian origin.

Partial filmography

 The Black Eagle (1946) - Una ragazza alla festa
 The Great Dawn (1947) - Daisy
 Flesh Will Surrender (1947) - Ginevra Canale
 The Mysterious Rider (1948) - L'imperatrice Caterina II di Russia
 Alarm Bells (1949) - Australia
 The Emperor of Capri (1949) - Sonia Bulgarov
 Torment (1950) - Anna Ferrari
 Cintura di castità (1950)
 Chains (1950) - Rosa Carrisi
 The Elusive Twelve (1950) - Herself
 Nobody's Children (1951) - Luisa Fanti / Sister Addolorata
 The Overcoat (1952) - Caterina
 Are We All Murderers? (1952) - Yvonne Le Guen (version italienne)
 The Shameless Sex (1952) - Wanda
 Falsehood (1952) - Luisa Sangro
 Who is Without Sin (1952) - Maria Dermoz
 Noi peccatori (1953) - Lucia
 When You Read This Letter (1953) - Irène Faugeret
 Nero and the Burning of Rome (1953) - Stabilia Messalina
 The Three Musketeers (1953) - Milady de Winter
 Star of India (1954) - Madame Montespan
 Torna! (1954) - Susanna
 Bread, Love and Jealousy (1954) - La nuova levatrice (uncredited)
 The White Angel (1955) - Sister Addolorata / Lina Mercolin
 La moglie è uguale per tutti (1955) - Yvonne Micucci
 The Miller's Beautiful Wife (1955) - Donna Dolores
 Escape to the Dolomites (1955) - Teresa
 Il campanile d'oro (1955) - Carmela
 This Angry Age (1957) - Carmen
 L'ultima violenza (1957) - Anna Carani
 Melancholic Autumn (1958) - María Martínez
 We Have Only One Life (1958) - Bibi
 World of Miracles (1959) - Sarah
 Rome 1585 (1961) - Donna Olimpia di Gonzales
 Black City (1961) - Mariannina
 Anima nera (1962) - Olga Manfredi
 Lo smemorato di Collegno (1962) - Linda Ballarini
 Django (1966) - Redhead Saloon Girl (uncredited)
 Day of Anger (1967) - Vivien Skill
 The Biggest Bundle of Them All (1968) - Teresa
 Il profeta (1968) - Carla Bagni
 Il ragazzo che sorride (1969) - Mother of Livia
 Pensando a te (1969)
 Don Franco e Don Ciccio nell'anno della contestazione (1970) - Donna Camilla - madre di Anna
 The Conformist (1970) - Madre di Giulia
 Un apprezzato professionista di sicuro avvenire (1972) - Lucetta's mother
 A.A.A. Massaggiatrice bella presenza offresi... (1972) - Mother of Cristina

References

External links

1925 births
2003 deaths
Greek film actresses
Greek people of Turkish descent
Italian people of Turkish descent
Italian people of Russian descent
Actors from Thessaloniki
Greek expatriates in Italy